The Staunton River is a  stream in the U.S. state of Virginia.  Flowing entirely within Shenandoah National Park, it is a tributary of the Rapidan River and part of the Rappahannock River watershed.

See also
List of rivers of Virginia

References

USGS Hydrologic Unit Map - State of Virginia (1974)

Rivers of Virginia
Tributaries of the Rappahannock River